Nazırlı (also, Nazirli and Nəzirli) is a village and municipality in the Barda Rayon of Azerbaijan.  It has a population of 1,611.

References 

Populated places in Barda District